Paquetá is a Portuguese surname. Notable people with the surname include:

 Marcos Paquetá (born 1958), Brazilian footballer 
 Matheus Paquetá (born 1995), Brazilian footballer
 Lucas Paquetá (born 1997), Brazilian footballer

Portuguese-language surnames